is a district located in Oshima Subprefecture, Hokkaido, Japan.

As of 2004, the district has an estimated population of 24,463 and a density of 51.09 persons per km2. The total area is 478.82 km2.

Towns  

Mori
Shikabe

Mergers
On December 1, 2004, the town of Minamikayabe was merged into the expanded city of Hakodate.
On April 1, 2005, the town of Sawara merged into the town of Mori.

Districts in Hokkaido